Rev. Pooley Shuldman Henry (1801–1881) was a British-Irish clergyman and academic. He was an ordained Presbyterian minister and was Chancellor of the Queen's University, Belfast, then called Queen's College between 1845–1879. He was the first to hold the role.

References

1801 births
1881 deaths
Irish educators
Irish Presbyterian ministers